This is a list of Chinese football transfers for the 2017 season summer transfer window. The transfer windows of Chinese Super League, China League One, and China League Two were opened on 19 June 2017 and closed on 14 July 2017.

Super League

Beijing Sinobo Guoan

In:

Out:

Changchun Yatai

In:

Out:

Chongqing Dangdai Lifan

In:

Out:

Guangzhou Evergrande Taobao

In:

 

Out:

Guangzhou R&F

In:

Out:

Guizhou Hengfeng Zhicheng

In:

Out:

Hebei China Fortune

In:

 

Out:

Henan Jianye

In:

Out:

Jiangsu Suning

In:

Out:

Liaoning FC

In:

Out:

Shandong Luneng Taishan

In:

Out:

Shanghai Greenland Shenhua

In:

Out:

Shanghai SIPG

In:

Out:

Tianjin Quanjian

In:

Out:

Tianjin Teda

In:

 

Out:

Yanbian Funde

In:

Out:

League One

Baoding Yingli ETS

In:

 

Out:

Beijing Enterprises

In:

Out:

Beijing Renhe

In:

Out:

Dalian Transcendence

In:

Out:

Dalian Yifang

In:

Out:

Hangzhou Greentown

In:

Out:

Meizhou Hakka

In:

Out:

Nei Mongol Zhongyou

In:

Out:

Qingdao Huanghai

In:

Out:

Shanghai Shenxin

In:

Out:

Shenzhen F.C.

In:

Out:

Shijiazhuang Ever Bright

In:

 

Out:

Wuhan Zall

In:

Out:

Xinjiang Tianshan Leopard

In:

Out:

Yunnan Lijiang

In:

Out:

Zhejiang Yiteng

In:

Out:

League Two

North League

Baotou Nanjiao

In:

Out:

Beijing BIT

In:

Out:

Dalian Boyoung

In:

Out:

Hebei Elite

In:

Out:

Heilongjiang Lava Spring

In:

Out:

Jiangsu Yancheng Dingli

In:

Out:

Jilin Baijia

In:

Out:

Qingdao Jonoon

In:

Out:

Shaanxi Chang'an Athletic

In:

Out:

Shenyang Dongjin

In:

Out:

Shenyang Urban

In:

Out:

Yinchuan Helanshan

In:

 

Out:

South League

Chengdu Qbao

In:

Out:

Hainan Boying

In:

Out:

Hunan Billows

In:

Out:

Jiangxi Liansheng

In:

Out:

Meizhou Meixian Techand

In:

Out:

Nantong Zhiyun

In:

Out:

Shanghai JuJu Sports

In:

Out:

Shanghai Sunfun

In:

Out:

Shenzhen Ledman

In:

Out:

Sichuan Longfor

In:

Out:

Suzhou Dongwu

In:

Out:

Zhenjiang Huasa

In:

Out:

References

2017
Transfers summer 2017
China